Ben 10: Omniverse is an American animated television series and the fourth installment of the Ben 10 franchise, which aired on Cartoon Network from August 1, 2012, to November 14, 2014, in the United States. Man of Action Studios, consisting of Duncan Rouleau, Joe Casey, Joe Kelly, and Steven T. Seagle, created the franchise.

Each Ben 10 Omniverse episode is about 22 minutes in length, with two-part episodes (such as the series premiere "The More Things Change", to"Showdown", "The Frogs of War", "Weapon XI" to "It's a Mad, Mad, Mad Ben World") being about 44 minutes combined in length. Only forty episodes were ordered at first with the 2010 Cartoon Network Studios logo, but on August 25, 2012, production of episode 41 began, with 20 more episodes being ordered, bringing the total up to 60. However it was expanded to 80 in June 2013.
The 80 episodes have been broken into eight story arcs consisting of 10 episodes each. The series has 2 Cartoon Network Studios logos across the 80 episodes, the 2010 one for episodes from story arcs 1–4 and the 2013 one for story arcs 5–8. The episodes aired out of the intended production order. The table below shows the broadcast order of the episodes.

Series overview

Episodes

Story Arc 1: A New Beginning (2012)

Story Arc 2: Malware's Revenge  (2012–13)

Story Arc 3: Incursean Invasion  (2013)

Story Arc 4: Duel of the Duplicates  (2013)

Story Arc 5: Galactic Monsters (2014)

Story Arc 6: The Evil Rooters  (2014)

Story Arc 7: The Mad Nightmare  (2014)

Story Arc 8: The Time War  (2014)

Home media
In region one, Warner Home Video have released the entire first three-story arcs and five episodes from each of story arcs four and five on five DVD sets from February 5, 2013, to September 16, 2014. The entire series is also available on digital purchase in eight separate volumes, such as complete story arcs.

See also
 List of Ben 10 2005 episodes
 List of Ben 10 2016 episodes
 List of Ben 10: Alien Force episodes
 List of Ben 10: Ultimate Alien episodes

Notes

References

General
  
 
 
Specific

Lists of American children's animated television series episodes
Lists of Cartoon Network television series episodes
2010s television-related lists
Omniverse